Events in the year 1839 in Bolivia.

Incumbents
President: Andrés de Santa Cruz until February 20, José Miguel de Velasco Franco
Supreme Protector of the Peru-Bolivian Confederation: Andrés de Santa Cruz until February 20

Events
January 6 - War of the Confederation: Battle of Buin
January 12 - War of the Confederation: Battle of Casma
January 20 - War of the Confederation: Battle of Yungay
August 25 - dissolution of the Peru-Bolivian Confederation

Births

Deaths

 
1830s in Bolivia